The American Sociological Association (ASA) is a non-profit organization dedicated to advancing the discipline and profession of sociology. Founded in December 1905 as the American Sociological Society at Johns Hopkins University by a group of fifty people, the first president of the association would be Lester Frank Ward. Today, most of its members work in academia, while around 20 percent of them work in government, business, or non-profit organizations.
 
ASA publishes ten academic journals and magazines, along with four section journals. Among these publications, the American Sociological Review is perhaps the best known, while the newest is an open-access journal titled Socius: Sociological Research for a Dynamic World. Contexts is one of their magazines, designed to share the study of sociology with other disciplines as well as the public. 

The ASA is currently the largest professional association of sociologists in the world, even larger than the International Sociological Association. The ASA consists of over 13,000 members—composed of researchers, students, college/university faculty, high school faculty, and various practitioners—while its 52 special-interest sections contain more than 21,000 members. The "American Sociological Association Annual Meeting" is an annual academic conference held by the Association consisting of over 6,000 participants.

History

Mission 
The mission of the ASA is to advance sociology as a scientific discipline and as a profession serving the public good. 

As the national organization for sociologists, the ASA provides a unique set of services to its members, promoting the vitality, visibility, and diversity of the discipline. Function at both the national and international level, the Association aims to articulate policy and implement programs likely to have the broadest possible impact for sociology now and in the future.

Founding 
In the summer of 1905, a George Washington University professor began a discussion among sociologists throughout the United States, writing to several dozen people to gauge the need for or interest in forming an sociological organization. Ultimately, a consensus was reached that the time had come for a society of sociologists in the U.S.

In early December, the professor and eight others wrote to about 300 people inviting them to a special session during the American Economic Association (AEA) and American Political Science Association meetings later that month to discuss the potential formation of a sociological society.

On December 27, approximately 50 people, including one woman, gathered in McCoy Hall at Johns Hopkins University, Baltimore, and, by its end, the group would motion to form a new society of sociologists. Though there would be debate as to integrating this new society with an existing organization, such as the AEA, the group would ultimately decide that the new society ought to be an independent entity.

The committee 
At the end of the day of the initial meeting, those gathered at the meeting formed a five-person committee to develop a plan for the new society and how it should be governed. The committee members would re-convene the next afternoon to review the proposed structure of the society. Council members would include Edward A. Ross, W.F. Wilcox, Albion Small, Samuel Lindsay, D. C. Wells, and William Davenport.

The following men would be elected officers of the new society: 

 Lester Frank Ward, President
 William Graham Sumner, First Vice President
 Franklin Giddings, Second Vice President
 C.W.A. Veditz (the professor), Secretary and Treasurer

When the committee left Baltimore, the birth of the American Sociological Society was complete, a Constitution had been adopted, officers were elected, and plans were made for the second Annual Meeting of the new Society.

1905-1980 
In 1981, in celebration the Association's 75th anniversary, Lawrence J. Rhoades prepared a 90-page publication entitled A History of the American Sociological Association, 1905-1980, commonly referred to as the "1981 Rhoades History." The publication provides a brief overview of the founding and early years of the Association, as well as highlights of key activities and events in the decades since.

In 1953, during the Annual Meeting in Berkeley, California, each of the (living) past presidents of the Society would compose a voice recording to address the coming generation of sociologists.

1981-2011

100-Year Anniversary 
In 2005, in celebration of the Association's 100-year anniversary, ASA would publish a 201-page book entitled A History of the American Sociological Association, 1981-2004. The publication picks up where the 1981 Rhoades history concludes, continuing the story and capturing the Association's history from 1981 through 2004. It is the culmination of over two years of detailed research by Katherine J. Rosich. The objective of this volume would be to describe and report on the major events in the life of ASA during the last two decades of the 20th century, leading up to a new century and millennium, as well as to commemorate the ASA's 100th anniversary in 2005.

The "ASA Wikipedia" Initiative 
In the fall of 2011, the ASA launched its "Sociology in Wikipedia" initiative. Erik Olin Wright, President of the ASA, called for improvement in sociological entries in Wikipedia. He asked that professors and students to get more involved by having Wikipedia-writing assignments in class. The basic goal set forth by the initiative would be to make it easier for sociologists to contribute to Wikipedia, and for sociologists to become better involved in the writing and editing processes to ensure that social science articles are up-to-date, complete, accurate, and written appropriately.

In conjunction with the Wikimedia Foundation and a research group at Carnegie Mellon University, the ASA developed its Wikipedia Portal in an attempt to achieve the initiative’s goal through providing tutorials on how to contribute; video discussions of norms and procedures; and lists of articles and subject areas that need improvement. The Portal would also provide instructions for professors on how to use Wikipedia writing assignments for academic courses.

Code of Ethics 
The ASA is governed by a code of ethics and ethical standards, which has been revised since 1970, with the first ASA code of ethics being written in 1970. The Committee on Professional Ethics worked to write this code and upon completing and approving it in 1997, the code focused on three goals, which would be to make the code more educative, accessible/easier to use, and more helpful for sociologists to understand ethical issues.

Publications

ASA Style Guide 

ASA style is a widely accepted format for writing university research papers that specifies the arrangement and punctuation of footnotes and bibliographies. Standards for ASA style are specified in the ASA Style Guide, which is designed to aid authors in preparing manuscripts for ASA journals and publications.

ASA Academic Journals and Magazines 
The association publishes the following academic journals and magazines:

The ASA also publishes Footnotes, a newsletter aimed at the association's members. Footnotes was established in 1979 and is published five times per year.

Organizational structure

ASA Officers 
President
Vice President
Secretary
Council-Members-At Large
President-Elect
Vice President-Elect

Presidents 
The following persons have been presidents of the American Sociological Association:

Regional Associations 
The ASA is aligned with several regional associations, as well as various state-based, international, cause-oriented, and academic associations. The regional Associations associated with the ASA include:

District of Columbia Sociological Society
Eastern Sociological Society
Mid-South Sociological Association
Midwest Sociological Society
New England Sociological Association
North Central Sociological Association
Pacific Sociological Association
Southern Sociological Society
 Southwestern Sociological Association

Membership
There are five different types of membership categories: 

 Regular membership
 Student members
 Associate members
 International associate members
 Emeritus members

ASA Members may also join special interest sections at an additional cost to their membership.

Sections
Members of the ASA belong to sections devoted to specific subfields, such as Social Psychology or Medical Sociology, for example. Each section has its own set of officers and committees that organize sessions at the annual conference and present awards to section members for their achievements, among other things. Some sections also operate their own academic journals, such as Society and Mental Health edited by the Section on the Sociology of Mental Health, or Sociology of Race & Ethnicity edited by the Section for Racial and Ethnic Minorities. The association comprises the following specialist sections:

Meetings 
The Annual Meeting of the ASA is held each August to provide opportunity for professionals involved in the study of society to share knowledge and new directions in research and practice. It provides networking outlets for nearly 3,000 research papers and 4,600 presenters. The meeting is spread across four days and covers 600 program sessions.

All ASA Committees and Task Forces meet during the annual meeting. The ASA Council and several Constitutional Committees meet mid-year during the winter months in Washington D.C.

Awards
Every year, in August, the ASA presents awards to individuals and groups deserving of recognition. The awards presented are:

 Distinguished Scholarly Book Major ASA Award
 Dissertation Major ASA Award
 Excellence in the Reporting of Social Issues Major ASA Award
 Jessie Bernard Major ASA Award
 Cox-Johnson-Frazier Major ASA Award
 Award for the Public Understanding of Sociology Major ASA Award
 Distinguished Career Major ASA Award for the Practice of Sociology
 Distinguished Contributions to Teaching Major ASA Award
 W.E.B. Du Bois Career of Distinguished Scholarship Award

Additionally, the Sections of the ASA administer separate multiple awards, which are presented each August during the Annual Meeting.

Controversies 
In 1993, then-doctoral student Rik Scarce was jailed for more than five months as a result of following the ASA's code of ethics. Scarce's Ph.D. research was on the radical environmental movement. Based on an FBI investigation of an Animal Liberation Front break-in, federal prosecutors argued in court that Scarce may have engaged in conversations with individuals believed to be involved with the incident. Prosecutors demanded that Scarce testify to a federal grand jury about those conversations, but Scarce refused to answer three dozen questions, citing the ASA Code of Ethics and the First Amendment as his reasoning for remaining unresponsive. Scarce's refusal to answer resulted in a contempt of court citation and 159 days spent in jail. He was never suspected of wrongdoing and—in keeping with contempt of court practice—he was never read his Miranda rights, arrested, or tried.

In early 2010, ASA publicly expressed outrage over a controversy involving Frances Fox Piven and Glenn Beck, asking Fox News to stop Beck's comments. An article written by Piven concerning mobilization of unemployed individuals had spurred the commentary by Beck. ASA suggests in their public statements that the line should be drawn at name calling and that political commentators should instead rely on gathering evidence related to the topics and then drawing the proper conclusions.

In January 2012, a United States district court ordered Boston College to turn over material from the "Belfast Project", an oral history project pertaining to the violence in Northern Ireland. Boston College filed an appeal in February 2012, challenging the district court's decision. ASA became involved in the case to help protect human participants from the subpoena of confidential project research data. The statement by the ASA council cited the potential damage this ruling would have on social science research by stifling the ability to study controversial topics. ASA is looking for an affirmation by the court for confidentiality in research.

Critique 
Within the Environmental sociology section of the ASA, an ad hoc Committee on Racial Equity investigated racial and ethnic diversity within the section in response to critique that the section was overwhelmingly white. Their assessment of the professional climate for scholars of colour concluded that the section was a 'white space' characterized by the overwhelming presence of whites and dominated by white leadership. They concluded that this situation acts as a barrier to inclusion of people of colour in the field, and that the field of environmental justice was likewise marginalised.

See also
 New York State Sociological Association
 List of sociological associations

References

External links
 
 
 North Central Sociological Association website

1905 establishments in the United States
Professional associations based in the United States
Member organizations of the American Council of Learned Societies
Sociological organizations